John Chancellor Award for Excellence in Journalism is an annual award of $25,000 selected by a panel of journalists, for courageous and sustained reporting.

Established in 1995, the award was formerly administered by the University of Pennsylvania, and is administered by the Columbia University Graduate School of Journalism.
Ira Lipman provided a gift to Columbia University to support the award.
He became a lifelong friend of John Chancellor after they met in Little Rock, Arkansas in 1957.

Winners

References

American journalism awards
Awards established in 1995
Awards and prizes of Columbia University
Columbia University Graduate School of Journalism